Michal Baláž (born 28 August 1970) is a Serbian-Slovak former professional footballer who played as a goalkeeper.

Career
Born in Stara Pazova, SR Serbia, back then within Yugoslavia, Baláž started playing with FK Vojvodina. He made a league debut for them in his only appearance in the 1990–91 Yugoslav First League. He spent the season 1989–90 on loan at third level side FK Kabel. He then played two seasons with FK BSK Batajnica until 1994.

In Autumn 1995 he played in Slovakia, with FC Spartak Trnava in the first half of the 1995–96 Slovak Superliga. He was playing with FK Petrimex Prievidza in the Slovak Super Liga before moving to Germany in summer 1998 and joining Sportfreunde Siegen. He also played with SV Wilhelmshaven during the second half of the 1999–2000 season. He later played with KFC Uerdingen 05 during the first half of the 2000–01 Regionalliga and then during the winter-break he returned to Sportfreunde Siegen and played with them the following two and a half years in the Regionalliga Sud.

References

1970 births
Living people
People from Stara Pazova
Slovaks of Vojvodina
Slovak footballers
Serbian footballers
Association football goalkeepers
FK Vojvodina players
FK Kabel players
FK BSK Batajnica players
Yugoslav First League players
FC Spartak Trnava players
FC Baník Prievidza players
Slovak Super Liga players
Sportfreunde Siegen players
SV Wilhelmshaven players
KFC Uerdingen 05 players
Slovak expatriate footballers
Slovak expatriate sportspeople in Germany
Expatriate footballers in Germany